54 Broadway sometimes known as Broadway Buildings is an office building in Broadway, London.

History
The building, which has a prominent mansard roof, was completed around 1924, when it became the main operating base for the Secret Intelligence Service. During the Second World War it had a brass plaque identifying it as the offices of the "Minimax Fire Extinguisher Company". Sir Stewart Menzies, Chief of the Secret Intelligence Service, had access to a tunnel, which connected 54 Broadway to his private residence in Queen Anne's Gate. Kim Philby, who worked in the building during the war, described it as

The building has been used as overflow facility by London Underground, based at 55 Broadway, since the Secret Intelligence Service moved out to Century House in 1964.

Explanatory notes

Citations

General sources 
 

Buildings and structures in the City of Westminster
Secret Intelligence Service